Bergslagernas Järnvägar was the largest private railroad company of Sweden with a main line from Gothenburg to Falun, in all 478 km. Bergslagernas Järnvägar (BJ) was founded in the 1870s to form a transportation system from Bergslagen, the ore-rich areas in southern Sweden to the port in Gothenburg. It was nationalized and merged into Swedish State Railways in 1948.

Defunct companies of Sweden
Defunct railway companies of Sweden
1870s establishments in Sweden
Railway companies disestablished in 1948